The remains of a seventeenth century cargo vessel were identified in Gunwalloe fishing cove, Cornwall in 1998. The site was designated under the Protection of Wrecks Act on 23 May 1999. The wreck is a Protected Wreck managed by Historic England.

The wreck 
The wreck site consists of iron guns, an anchor, an iron object, and possible smaller objects.

Discovery and investigation 
The site was found in 1998 and subsequently surveyed by the Archaeological Diving Unit. In 2005 Wessex Archaeology undertook a designation assessment.

Identity 
It is believed that the site represents the wreck of the President, a 500-ton English East Indiaman built in 1671 and lost in 1684. The cannon on site correspond with a seventeenth century date. No archaeological evidence exists to confirm this identity.

References 

Protected Wrecks of England